Lindsay Baglin (born 2 March 1929) is  a former Australian rules footballer who played with Footscray and North Melbourne in the Victorian Football League (VFL).

Notes

External links 		
		
		
		
		
		
		
Living people		
1929 births	
Australian rules footballers from Victoria (Australia)		
Western Bulldogs players		
North Melbourne Football Club players